Accidents and incidents involving transport or storage of ammunition include:
 1634 Valletta explosion, Malta
 An Ottoman ammunition dump inside the Parthenon was ignited by Venetian bombardment in 1687
 1806 Birgu polverista explosion, Malta
 Leiden gunpowder disaster, in 1807 a ship carrying 17,760 kg of gunpowder blew up in the Dutch town of Leiden. 
 Siege of Almeida (1810), a chance shell ignited a line of black powder which set off a chain reaction in the magazine
 Negro Fort, a British-built fort on the Apalachicola River, occupied by fugitive slaves and Choctaws, was destroyed in 1816 when a hot-shot fired by a US gunboat landed in the fort's magazine.
 City Point, Virginia, Union army supply depot sabotaged in 1864 by Confederate Secret Service
 Yanwath, 1867 railway explosion when a freight train carrying 3 tons of gunpowder derailed and another freight train hit the wreckage.
 Regent's Park explosion, in 1874 a barge carrying 5 tons of gunpowder blew up on the Regent's Canal in London
 , in Havana harbor in 1898 (origin of explosion is disputed)
Kings Mills, Ohio, in 1890, freight cars on the Little Miami Railroad collided with cars containing gunpowder and cartridges from the King Powder Company and the Peters Cartridge Company, killing 11 and wounding about 100.
 Black Tom explosion, 1916 act of sabotage on American ammunition supplies by German agents during World War I
 Kingsland explosion, American munitions factory in 1917
 Halifax Explosion, 1917 ammunition ship explosion that killed over 1,600 people
 Morgan Depot Explosion, American munitions factory in 1918
 Pollepel Island, August 1920 explosion at Bannerman's Island Arsenal
 Dublin Four Courts explosion 1922 explosion of munitions stored by the anti-Treaty IRA in the Four Courts building in Dublin, which destroyed much of Ireland's pre-1921 public records. 
 Lake Denmark explosion, July 10, 1926 detonation of millions of pounds of stored explosives at Picatinny Arsenal, New Jersey
 Smederevo Fortress explosion, the Wehrmacht stockpile of captured ammunition and gasoline at Smederevo Fortress exploded due to unknown reasons
 Joliet Army Ammunition Plant explosion, a 1942 explosion that was felt 100 miles away
 Air raid on Bari, a port disaster in Italy in 1943
 , ammunition ship that caught fire in New York Harbor in 1943 
 Naval Station Norfolk, September 17, 1943 accidental truckload explosion of 24 aerial depth charges, killing 40 and injuring 386 
 Naval Weapons Station Yorktown VA November 1943 explosion – 6 killed 
 , 1943 naval explosion in Lower New York Bay
 Bombay Explosion (1944), explosion on a ship in Bombay Harbour
 , 20 April 1944, a Liberty ship carrying cargo of high explosives and bombs, sunk by Luftwaffe
 Soham rail disaster, 2 June 1944, fire and subsequent explosion of a freight wagon carrying high explosives.
 West Loch disaster, ammunition explosion in Pearl Harbor, two months before Port Chicago
 Port Chicago disaster, a deadly munitions explosion that occurred in 1944, at the Port Chicago Naval Magazine in California
 Hastings Naval Ammunition Depot, Nebraska, 27 September 1944 munitions explosions causing nine deaths and extensive damage.
 , 10 November 1944 explosion of an ammunition ship at Seeadler Harbor, 432 killed
 Tolar, New Mexico, 30 November 1944, munitions carried by train exploded, causing extensive damage to town and killing 1.
 RAF Fauld explosion, UK underground munitions storage depot in 1944, one of the largest non-nuclear explosions in history
 , a Liberty ship carrying ammunition, was hit by a kamikaze pilot and disintegrated in an enormous explosion on December 28, 1944.
 , 29 January 1945 explosion of an ammunition ship off Lunga Point, Guadalcanal. US Coast Guard-crewed. 254 killed (196 USCG, 57 US Army, and 1 US Public Health Service physician)
 , unloading accident in Bari, Italy, 9 April 1945
 ,  and  each with 6,000 pounds of ammunition sank after kamikaze attacks caused an explosion near Okinawa in 1945.
 , 1945 incident in Vancouver similar to El Estero
 Cádiz Explosion, 18 August 1947, in mines and torpedoes depot, ca. 150 killed and large part of the city destroyed
 Mitholz explosion, Switzerland, an underground ammunition depot partially exploded on 19 December 1947, destroying the village and killing 9.  Explosives are still on site posing a risk, their removal is planned to begin in 2030 and last 10 years.
 Prüm, Germany, 15 July 1949, a French Army depot with 500 tons of ammunition explodes, 12 killed
 South Amboy powder pier explosion, New Jersey, 1950
 Explosion of RFA Bedenham, 27 April 1951 explosion of an ammunition ship in the Port of Gibraltar
 Cali explosion, 1956 explosion of seven army ammunition trucks loaded with 1053 boxes of dynamite, which were parked overnight in Cali, Colombia.
 La Coubre explosion, 1960 explosion of a French freighter carrying grenades and munitions, in the harbour of Havana, Cuba.
 , shipwreck near Folkestone containing explosives that detonated during salvage in 1967 
 1973 Roseville Yard Disaster, high-explosive aircraft ammunition and ordnance in military boxcars in a Southern Pacific train consist in its Roseville, California railyard.
 Severomorsk Disaster, 13–17 May 1984, munitions fire at a Soviet naval base, 200–300 killed
 Río Tercero explosion, Argentina, 1995
 2008 Gërdec explosions, Albania
 Evangelos Florakis Naval Base explosion, Cyprus, 2011
 2020 Beirut Explosion August 4, 2020, a large amount of ammonium nitrate stored at the Port of Beirut in the capital city of Lebanon exploded, causing at least 218 deaths, 7,000 injuries
 2021 Bata explosions, Equatorial Guinea
 , explosive-filled Liberty ship wreck, off the UK's Kent coast (ongoing potential)

See also
 List of ammonium nitrate disasters
 Largest artificial non-nuclear explosions
 List of accidents and disasters by death toll: Explosions

References

References

Military lists
Ammunition
Hazardous materials